Heinrich Anton de Bary (26 January 183119 January 1888) was a German surgeon, botanist, microbiologist, and mycologist (fungal systematics and physiology).
He is considered a founding father of plant pathology (phytopathology) as well as the founder of modern mycology. His extensive and careful studies of the life history of fungi and contribution to the understanding of algae and higher plants were landmarks of biology.

Early life and education 
Born in Frankfurt, Anton de Bary was one of ten children born to physician August Theodor de Bary (1802–1873) and Emilie Meyer de Bary. His father encouraged him to join the excursions of the active group of naturalists who collected specimens in the nearby countryside. De Bary’s youthful interest in plants and in examination of fungi and algae were inspired by George Fresenius, a physician, who also taught botany at Senckenberg Institute. Fresenius was an expert on thallophytes. In 1848, de Bary graduated from a gymnasium at Frankfurt, and began to study medicine at Heidelberg, continuing at Marburg. In 1850, he went to Berlin to continue pursuing his study of medicine, and also continued to explore and develop his interest in plant science. He received his degree in medicine at Berlin in 1853, but his dissertation title was "De plantarum generatione sexuali", a botanical subject. The same year, he published a book on the fungi that caused rusts and smuts in plants.

Early career
After graduation, de Bary briefly practiced medicine in Frankfurt, but he was drawn back to botany and became Privatdozent in botany at the University of Tübingen, where he worked for a while as an assistant to Hugo von Mohl (1805–1872). In 1855, he succeeded the botanist Karl Wilhelm von Nägeli (1818–1891) at Freiburg, where he established the most advanced botanical laboratory at the time and directed many students.

Later career and research
In 1867, de Bary moved to the University of Halle as successor to Professor Diederich Franz Leonhard von Schlechtendal, who, with Hugo von Mohl, co-founded the pioneer botanical journal Botanische Zeitung. De Bary became its coeditor and later sole editor. As an editor of and contributor to the journal, he exercised great influence upon the development of botany. After the Franco-Prussian War (1870–1871), de Bary was appointed professor of botany at the University of Strasbourg, where he was the founder of the Jardin botanique de l'Université de Strasbourg, and was also elected as the inaugural rector of the reorganized university. He conducted much research in the university botanical institute, attracted many students from Europe and America, and made a large contribution to the development of botany.

His 1884 book Vergleichende Morphologie und Biologie der Pilze, Mycetozoen und Bakterien was translated into English as Comparative Morphology and Biology of the Fungi, Mycetozoa, and Bacteria (Clarendon Press, 1887).

Fungi and plant diseases
De Bary was devoted to the study of the life history of fungi. At that time, various fungi were still considered to arise through spontaneous generation. He proved that pathogenic fungi were not the products of cell contents of the affected plants and did not arise from the secretion of the sick cells. 

In de Bary’s time, potato late blight had caused sweeping crop devastation and economic loss. He studied the pathogen Phytophthora infestans (formerly Peronospora infestans) and elucidated its life cycle. The origin of plant diseases was not known at that time. Much as Miles Joseph Berkeley (1803–1889) had insisted in 1841 that the oomycete found in potato blight was the cause of the disease, de Bary declared that the rust and smut fungi were the causes of the pathological changes in diseased plants. He concluded that Uredinales and Ustilaginales were parasites. 

De Bary spent much time studying the morphology of fungi and noticed that certain forms that had been classified as separate species were actually successive stages of development of the same organism. De Bary studied the developmental history of Myxomycetes (slime molds), and thought it was necessary to reclassify the lower animals. He first coined the term Mycetozoa to include lower animals and slime molds. In his work on Myxomycetes (1858), he pointed out that at one stage of their life cycle (the plasmodial stage), they were little more than formless, motile masses of the substance that Félix Dujardin (1801–1860) had called sarcode (protoplasm). This is the fundamental basis of the protoplasmic theory of life. 

De Bary was the first to demonstrate sexuality in fungi. In 1858, he had observed conjugation in the alga Spirogyra, and in 1861, he described sexual reproduction in the fungus Peronospora sp. He saw the necessity of observing the whole life cycle of pathogens and attempted to follow it in the living host plants.

Peronosporeae
De Bary published his first work on fungi in 1861, and then spent more than 15 years studying Peronosporeae, particularly Phytophthora infestans (formerly Peronospora infestans) and Cystopus (Albugo), parasites of potato. In his published work in 1863 entitled "Recherches sur le developpement de quelques champignons parasites", he reported having inoculated spores of P. infestans on healthy potato leaves and observed the penetration of the leaf and the subsequent growth of the mycelium that affected the tissue, the formation of conidia, and the appearance of the characteristic black spots of the potato blight. He also did similar experiments on potato stalks and tubers. He watched conidia in the soil and their infection of the tubers, observing that mycelium could survive the cold winter in the tubers. From all these studies, he concluded that organisms could not be generated spontaneously.

Puccinia graminis
He did a thorough investigation on Puccinia graminis, the pathogen of rust of wheat, rye and other grains. He noticed that P. graminis produced reddish summer spores called "urediospores", and dark winter spores called "teleutospores". He inoculated sporidia from the winter spores of the wheat rust on the leaves of the "common barberry" (Berberis vulgaris). The sporidia germinated and led to the formation of aecia with yellow spores, the familiar symptoms of infection on the barberry. De Bary then inoculated aecidiospores on moisture-retaining slides and then transferred them to the leaves of seedling of rye plants. In time, he observed the reddish summer spores appearing in the leaves. The sporidia from the winter spores germinated, but only on barberry. De Bary clearly demonstrated that P. graminis required different hosts during the different stages of its development (a phenomenon he called "heteroecism" in contrast to "autoecism", when development takes place only in one host). De Bary’s discovery explained why the eradication of barberry plants had long been practiced as a control for rust.

Lichen
De Bary also studied the formation of lichens which are the result of an association between a fungus and an alga. He traced the stages through which they grew and reproduced and the adaptations that enabled them to survive drought and winter. He coined the word "symbiosis" in 1879 in his monograph "Die Erscheinung der Symbiose" (Strasbourg, 1879) as "the living together of unlike organisms". He carefully studied the morphology of molds, yeasts, and fungi and basically established mycology as an independent science.

Influence
De Bary's concept and methods had a great impact on the growing field of bacteriology and botany. He published more than 100 research papers and influenced many students who later became distinguished botanists and microbiologists such as Sergei Winogradsky (1856–1953), William Gilson Farlow (1844–1919), and Pierre-Marie-Alexis Millardet (1838–1902). He was one of the most influential of the 19th century bioscientists.

Personal life and death
De Bary married Antonie Einert in 1861; they raised four children. He died on 19 January 1888 in Strasbourg, of a tumor of the jaw, after undergoing extensive surgery.

See also
 List of mycologists
 Wm. Theodore de Bary, American sinologist, a great-nephew

References

 King-Thom Chung, Department of Microbiology and Molecular Cell Sciences, The University of Memphis, Memphis, Tennessee
 Groll, E. K. (ed.): Biografien der Entomologen der Welt: Datenbank. Version 4.15: Senckenberg Deutsches Entomologisches Institut, 2010

Further reading

External links
 

1831 births
1888 deaths
Phycologists
19th-century German botanists
German surgeons
German mycologists
German entomologists
Physicians from Frankfurt
Heidelberg University alumni
University of Marburg alumni
Humboldt University of Berlin alumni
Academic staff of the University of Tübingen
Academic staff of the University of Freiburg
Academic staff of the Martin Luther University of Halle-Wittenberg
Academic staff of the University of Strasbourg
Corresponding members of the Saint Petersburg Academy of Sciences
Foreign Members of the Royal Society
Symbiosis
Scientists from Frankfurt
Members of the Göttingen Academy of Sciences and Humanities